Rosanoff is the surname of:
 Aaron Rosanoff (1878-1943) a Russian-American psychiatrist
 Martin André Rosanoff (1874–1951) a Russian-American chemist
 Lillian Rosanoff Lieber (1886-1986) a mathematician and popular author

See also 
 Rozanov